National Geographic (Nat Geo Asia, formerly NBC Asia and National Geographic Channel and also commercially abbreviated and trademarked as Nat Geo or Nat Geo TV) is a pan-Asian subscription television channel that features non-fiction, factual programming involving nature, science, culture and history, produced by the National Geographic Society, just like History and Discovery Channel.

It was launched on 1 January 1994 as NBC Asia. As of 2008, the Asian version of National Geographic Channel is available in over 56 million homes. NGC Asia has six different channels of feeds.

History

NBC Asia (1994–1998) 
On 1 January 1994, the channel was officially launched as NBC Asia. It featured mostly NBC programs as well as the NBC Nightly News, The Tonight Show, Saturday Night Live and Late Night. Like its European counterpart, it could not broadcast United States-produced primetime shows due to rights restrictions. It did, however, also air some NBC Sports output. During weekday evenings, NBC Asia had a regional evening news program. It occasionally simulcast some programs from CNBC Asia and MSNBC.

National Geographic Asia (1998 – present) 
On 1 August 1998, NBC Asia was rebranded as the National Geographic Channel. The NBC programming moved to CNBC Asia.

On 4 February 2008, the Nat Geo Junior programming block of two non-contingent hours, late morning and late afternoon, was launched on the channel. I Didn't Know That, Mad Labs and Wild Detectives were the initial shows on the block.

In the most recent news, National Geographic and its sister channel Nat Geo Wild was currently remained on-air, even though that most of National Geographic libraries, including their Documentary Films, has been included on Disney+ (or Disney+ Hotstar for outside Singapore, Philippines, Hong Kong and Taiwan) content hub following Disney's partial ownership of National Geographic Global Networks. This would lead to some pay TV provider in Southeast Asia, mainly Malaysia & Indonesia, to drop out or replacing their channels following the recent news of closing down Disney/Fox channels sans the National Geographics. Unifi TV for example, has replace Nat Geo with Techstorm, which focus on technology and esports.
 
National Geographic, alongside Nat Geo Wild, officially ceased broadcasting in Malaysia on 1 February 2023 on Astro, but the channel still operates outside the country.

Feeds 

 National Geographic Asia – Broadcasts in both English and Cantonese via two audio tracks‚ as well as a Cantonese subtitles tracks.
 National Geographic India – It is aimed at India and neighbouring countries. It airs in English, Hindi, Tamil, Telugu and Bengali via five different audio tracks.
 National Geographic Israel – Includes a Hebrew subtitles track.
 National Geographic Middle East – It simulcasts the Asian from 11:00pm to 5:00am Hong Kong time. Arabic subtitles are available as well.
 National Geographic Japan – includes Japanese dubbing.
 National Geographic Taiwan – includes Chinese subtitles.
 National Geographic Hong Kong – features two audio tracks airing English and Cantonese programming, as well as a Chinese subtitles track.
 National Geographic Malaysia and Singapore – the US HD feed is distributed instead of the Asian one. US ads are replaced with Malaysian or Singaporean ads and they switch some latest episodes to older ones. Subtitles are available in English, Malay and Mandarin via all TV broadcasters.
 National Geographic Thailand – It simulcasts the Asian from 11:00pm to 5:00am Hong Kong time. Thai subtitles are available as well.

See also 
 National Geographic Channel (disambiguation)

References

External links 
 

Mass media in Southeast Asia
Asia
English-language television stations
Television channels and stations established in 1994
Cable television in Hong Kong